Manfredi is a surname.

Manfredi may also refer to:

Given name 
Manfredi Chiaramonte (died 1391), Sicilian nobleman
Manfredi Nicoletti (1930–2017), Italian architect
Manfredi Beninati (born 1970), Italian artist

Other uses 
Rocca dei Rettori or Castle of Manfredi, in Benevento, Italy
13225 Manfredi, an asteroid